Syariah (the Malay spelling of "Sharia") refers to Sharia law in Islamic religious law and deals with exclusively Islamic laws, having jurisdiction upon every Muslim in Malaysia. The Syariah Court system is one of the two separate court systems which exist in the general Malaysian legal system. There is a parallel system of state Syariah Courts, which have limited jurisdiction over matters of state Islamic law. Syariah Courts have jurisdiction only over Muslims in matters relating to family law and religious observance, and can generally only pass sentences of not more than three years' imprisonment, a fine of up to RM5,000, and/or up to six strokes of the cane.

Article 145 of the Malaysian constitution says the Attorney General of Malaysia has no power over matters related to the Syariah Courts.

There are three levels of the courts: Appeal, High, and Subordinate.

Unlike Malaysian civil courts, which are federal in scope, Syariah Courts are primarily established by individual state law. Similarly, Islamic law is a matter limited to each state, with the exception of the Federal Territories of Malaysia, as provided in Article 3 of the constitution. Thus, the application of Sharia law may differ among the states. There are 13 state Sharia law departments and one for the Federal Territories.

Chief Judges of the Syariah Court
 Sheikh Ghazali Abdul Rahman (1997–2009)
 Ibrahim Lembut (2009–2017)
 Mukhyuddin Ibrahim (2017–2019)
 Mohd Naim Mokhtar (2019–2022)

Judges of the Syariah Court of Appeal

Current judges
 Vacant
 Yusof Musa
 Mohd Shukor Sabudin 
 Saarani Ismail 
 Mohd Naim Mokhtar
 Mohd Amran Mat Zain

See also
 Sharia caning in Malaysia

References

External links

Department of Syariah Judiciary Malaysia Portal
Malaysian Syariah Court Web Portal (Malay)

Judiciary of Malaysia
Sharia in Malaysia
Islamic courts and tribunals